ALFTP is an FTP client and personal FTP server utility from ESTsoft for Microsoft Windows. It is part of ESTsoft's ALTools product family.

While it has been available in Korean since 2000 as freeware (commercialized in 2002 for government and corporate use), it was first made available in English in 2004, and has since been made available in over ten languages. Translations for ALFTP are provided by members of the ALTools user community.

The software received positive reviews in South Korea for its simplicity, and for having a Korean language interface, illustrating the importance of localization for software.

ALFTP is free for home use and may be freely redistributed.

Personal FTP Server
The personal FTP server in ALFTP requires no configuration, although several configuration options are available. The FTP server is intended for personal use by non-technical users to casually transfer files for home use. It is a single user interface, permissions, and user connection limit of 5 precludes ALFTP from being used in large sites, and is intended for casual home use.

ALTools Eggheads
The interface features the cartoon ALFTP Egghead animated in the main toolbar in various poses to represent the various functions available there, and for which the application is named.

The AL part in ALFTP is a transliteration from the Korean, '알FTP', which directly translates as EggFTP. Other ALTools feature similar egghead cartoon characters as mascots for each program.

License change
As of December 1, 2008, ALFTP is no longer freeware and requires a commercial licence for all uses. Copies downloaded before December 1, 2008 are not affected by this new requirement. 
As of August 22, 2012 ALFTP has been released for free use (the free serial number provided on website has the same rights to be used as when purchased the product).

See also
 ALZip
 ESTsoft
 Freely redistributable software
 List of FTP server software

References

External links
 ESTsoft site
 ALTools site
 ALFTP Home Page
 Flickr pages with various ALTools Eggheads
 License release notification

FTP clients
ESTsoft